The 31st Annual Australian Recording Industry Association Music Awards (generally known as ARIA Music Awards or simply The ARIAs) are a series of award ceremonies which include the 2017 ARIA Artisan Awards, ARIA Hall of Fame Awards, ARIA Fine Arts Awards and the ARIA Awards. The ARIA Awards ceremony was held on 28 November 2017 and was broadcast from the Star Event Centre, Sydney around Australia on the Nine Network. The Nine Network last broadcast the awards in 2013.

Final nominees were announced on 10 October 2017 at the Art Gallery of New South Wales. ARIA also held the award ceremonies for both Artisan Awards winners and Fine Arts Awards winners at that time. Gang of Youths won four of eight nominations, while Paul Kelly won four from seven. The ARIA Awards ceremony introduced a new category: ARIA Music Teacher of the Year Award, which is publicly voted. The category is open to any teacher working in a school, kindergarten, early childhood centre, youth centre or private tuition music school running a music program around the country. Daryl Braithwaite was inducted into the Hall of Fame as a solo artist; his band, Sherbet, was admitted in 1990.

Performers 

ARIA listed the line-up of performers for the ceremony:

ARIA Hall of Fame inductee

The following artist was inducted into the ARIA Hall of Fame:

 Daryl Braithwaite – Braithwaite was previously inducted as a member of Sherbet in 1990.

Nominees and winners

ARIA Awards

Winners are listed first and highlighted in boldface; other final nominees are listed alphabetically by artists' first name.

Public voted

Fine Arts Awards

Winners are listed first and highlighted in boldface; other final nominees are listed alphabetically by artists' first name.

Artisan Awards
Winners are listed first and highlighted in boldface; other final nominees are listed alphabetically by artists' first name.

References

External links
 

2017 in Australian music
2017 music awards
ARIA Music Awards